Blacka Di Danca is a dancer, choreographer, artist, and actor. He has toured and taught workshops in over 40 countries and 100 cities, including South America, Canada, Europe, and Russia. He is currently working on new music, developing influencer marketing campaigns, managing talent, and producing global dance events with his sports and fitness company Danca, digital media and entertainment agency, Danca Agency, and music label Danca Mafia Records.

Blacka was born in Brooklyn, New York on December 16, 1989, at St. Mary’s Hospital in Crown Heights. Growing up in a Caribbean household relates to his earliest memories of learning to dance. In the Caribbean, a common practice for family members is to hold the child’s hands up while teaching them not only how to walk, but also how to whine at the waist. Blacka’s mother played an integral role in his early inspiration to dance. She would play Reggae, Calypso, Soca, and Dancehall music at their family gatherings every holiday. For Blacka, this connection to his mother and family has been one of his greatest inspirations of strength and fortitude.

While growing up in New York, Blacka developed his self-expression by honing in on his creative abilities. He was particularly fond of art and spent a lot of time sketching, painting and drawing. In his earliest days of school at P.S. 8 in Brooklyn, he took African dance classes that sparked his inherent love for dance, as he recalls it being one of the most fun classes on the schedule. He furthered his creative exploration when he attended Satellite West Academy, where he studied art history, which served as a massive inspiration for his future crafts. These classes were a major inspiration for the young artist. As he got older, he developed his love for movement even more through karate and martial arts practice.

Blacka’s huge love for art set the tone for his academic studies as well. A turning point in the young dancer’s life was when he auditioned for the Brooklyn HighSchool of the Arts, formerly known as the Sarah J. Hale Highschool, which propelled him to learn even more about art and creativity. This immersion in fine arts studies sharpened his self-expression.

In 2002, Blacka began exploring more and more of Brooklyn’s robust dancehall scene. It was his mission to learn everything he could about the genre and dancing. Through rain and snow, Blacka would take the train, or any means he could, to attend dances in every borough, every single night of the week. It became his passion to learn as much as he could to become one of the best in the game.

Blacka began to learn more about music and performing when he began regularly joining the group New Kingston on the road. One night after a show where the group opened and played alongside Frankie Paul, he was able to stay in the club after hours, which made history as the night he experienced his first dancehall party.

This early dancehall experience would change his life as he realized dancing was something he felt called to do. When he looked into the crowd he saw two dancers doing the same dance in matching outfits and this sportsmanship reminded him of synchronized swimming. After that vivid introduction to Jamaican movement and sound, Blacka reached out to his friend JC Smoove, who was also a dancer. From there, he started training with Smoove’s guidance, which led him to begin learning Passa Passa dances by watching the Jamaican-based dancehall event on DVDs.

As he started going to various clubs including Temptations on Church Avenue, dancing became a nightly routine. Some of Blacka’s earliest influences came from the Crazy Hype Family, Active Dancers, and French Konnection dance crews, which he would watch as a means to learn. As his profile started rising in the dance scene, so did that of New Kingston as not only a band but also a sound system. Whenever they were booked for events, they would enlist Blacka as their official dancer, creating the show that would officially launch Blacka Di Danca.

As Blacka continued dancing and becoming more known on the Brooklyn scene, he began to overcome his early fears of stage fright. As his eyes got brighter, his smile grew wider and the opportunities began to pour in. One of his earliest memories of patrons watching him dance and liking what he brought to the table was a Dance competition at the Binghamton University Carnival. Blacka performed to an excitedly engaged audience with longtime friend DJ AK where he took home first place.

This constant study of dance and movement became a prevalent aspect of Blacka’s life. He heavily immersed himself into dancehall culture, honorarily adopted as a Jamaican, through his experience literally living in the dancehalls of Brooklyn. For him, his love of dancehall was also about understanding the people, the food, the taste, and the sounds. In 2007, he experienced his first booking to perform in Virginia with JC Smoove and Byrd Hype.

Blacka’s Life on Tour 
Blacka’s early days on tour with New Kingston gave him the introduction he needed to the lifestyle he would be called to live. In 2010, New Kingston began touring with Collie Buddz and Blacka Di Danca in tow. Blacka’s role on the tour was selling merchandise and dancing on stage with New Kingston during their set. He knew that by the end of the tour, he would be headlining alongside Collie Buddz, but wasn’t sure how it would come together. One night in Tallahassee, DJ Pee Wee called him on stage to perform in the main act with Collie Buddz to his popular song Mamacita. Blacka did the Skip to My Lou, Nuh Linga, Paper Bag, and more popular dances at the time, all while showing Collie how to dance too, which was a hit with the audience. In Orlando at a club called The Social, he called Blacka on stage again, and after the third show, Blacka officially became a dancer on tour with Collie Buddz.

In 2011, Blacka traveled to Russia for the first time when a contact there reached out to ask him to teach a class. This experience allowed him to envision his own tour and what that could look like as a solo act. In 2012, after his second trip to teach in Russia, Blacka began reaching out to anyone who had ever been interested in booking him to perform or teach a class. In 2013, Blacka alongside his manager and business partner Decio Bernardo organized approximately 16 solo workshop tours, which took him all over the world. Around this time, Blacka also planned his first official solo world tour. January 2015 marked one of his proudest moments when he danced in front of thousands of fans at a New Years' Eve performance at Madison Square Garden alongside Diplo and Skrillex. Throughout his career, Blacka also toured with Farruko, Major Lazer, Kreesha Turner, and Mr. Vegas.

A Global Dance Movement 
In 2010, Blacka officially quit his job as a concierge at Columbia University. In November of the same year, he taught his first dancehall class at the Fashion Institute of Technology (FIT). Two years later, Blacka was regularly teaching classes, renting well-known studios such as the Ripley Grier Studio formerly known as DANY studio in midtown Manhattan. He began teaching classes at the Broadway Dance Center, and throughout New York City, featuring in publications such as The New York Times.

In 2016, Blacka was officially signed to Red Bull as an athlete. Around this time he crossed over into the international music market as a dancer in Rihanna’s Work video. From there he continued choreographing and appearing in videos such as Janet Jackson ft. Daddy Yankee “Made For Now”, Shenseea ft. Tyga “Blessed”, Cardi B ft. El Alfa “Mi Mami”, Nicky Jam and J Balvin “X (Equis)” ASAP Rocky and Juicy J “Multiply,” XXXTentacion “Royalty” and more. He has also choreographed tours for Farruko and Luis Fonsi.

Around this time, Blacka founded Danca Family, a global dance crew of professional choreographers. The name was inspired by Danca crew member Nelly Danca, a long-time friend of Blacka and a professional choreographer in the agency.

In 2013, he began donating to the St. Martin des Porres Basic School in Gordon Town, St. Andrew, Jamaica. Blacka realized he wanted to create a sustainable environment for dancers to be able to make a living and learn their culture from a young age, in local environments, from other professional dancers. In 2016, He founded and runs Little Danca, a non-profit children’s performing arts organization, a direct result of the fruits of his labor and because of the recognizable work he has done in and around dancehall. Since its launch, the Little Danca has supported approximately fifty kids per week across three schools and divisions of basic and secondary. Most recently, Blacka organized drives to benefit victims of the Texas Winter Storm 2021, which provided food and meals for those in need. He has also worked with PETA to distribute healthy meals for his causes and received an award from the organization for his Vegan food outreach.

In 2019, Blacka received a certificate of recognition from New York Senator Kevin S. Parker for his leadership and dedication to teaching dance in the community and a certificate of merit for his achievements from the New York State Assembly.

In May 2020, Blacka moved to California to expand Danca Agency and start Danca Mafia Records so he could help facilitate growth in New York’s burgeoning dance scene. In the midst of the COVID-19 pandemic, he realized he could fill a void in Los Angeles as creatives began leaving the city. This move also gave him an opportunity to be closer to Empire, his digital distribution agency.

A Transition to Music 
In 2019, Blacka released his first single titled “Bubble Up”. The song inspired several viral dance videos through TikTok and Instagram. Fans from all over the world began submitting their own versions of “Bubble Up” which was included in the song’s official music video. Blacka’s second release titled “Another One” has also gone viral on social media platforms, along with his latest singles “Di Sauce” and “Buss Down”. Similar to his appeal with dancing and entertainment, Blacka’s music has begun to infiltrate and connect with fans all over the globe.

Forward Movements 
As Blacka continues to build the footprint of the Danca empire on both coasts, his focus has been to delve deeper into marketing, viral campaigns, brand identity design, and his passion for Blockchain technology. Blacka is the CEO of Danca, the parent company of Danca Agency and Danca Mafia Records.

He continues to appear on screen in major films such as Yellow Girl and Me and TikTok phenomena such as the recent “Buss Down” challenge, which has over 50 million views. In 2020, “Buss Down” was selected by ESPN Music as one of the main songs for the NBA playoffs and Finals. In 2021, Team Salut, the producers of Afro B’s single “Joanna” teamed up with Blacka to release a “Buss Down” remix on Danca Mafia Records titled “I Like That” by Team Salut and Blacka Di Danca.

Solidifying a legacy of inspiration, Blacka also launched Danca Athletic Sneakers, to inspire dancers to amplify their greatness. “Even if it feels like nobody sees you, everyone does,” says Blacka. The first release from Danca Athletic Sneakers is an all-white and gold model. “The all-white keeps you focused on your feet and the gold shine keep everyone else focused on your feet.” In 2021, Danca Athletic released an all-pink design titled “Danca Ballerinas”.

An inspiration to the new generation of dancers, Blacka Di Danca continues to inspire others to simply do their best, dance their best, and build the life of their dreams.

Awards

References 

Living people
African-American male dancers
African-American choreographers
American choreographers
20th-century African-American people
African-American male rappers
African-American artists
21st-century African-American people
1989 births